James Doolittle may refer to:

James Rood Doolittle (1815–1897), U.S. Senator from Wisconsin, 1857–1869
Jimmy Doolittle (1896–1993), U.S. Army general, aviator, and World War II hero